The Woods–Saxon potential is a mean field potential for the nucleons (protons and neutrons) inside the atomic nucleus, which is used to describe approximately the forces applied on each nucleon, in the nuclear shell model for the structure of the nucleus. The potential is named after Roger D. Woods and David S. Saxon.

The form of the potential, in terms of the distance r from the center of nucleus, is:

where V0 (having dimension of energy) represents the potential well depth,

Typical values for the parameters are: , .

For large atomic number A this potential is similar to a potential well. It has the following desired properties
 It is monotonically increasing with distance, i.e. attracting.
 For large A, it is approximately flat in the center.
 Nucleons near the surface of the nucleus (i.e. having  within a distance of order a) experience a large force towards the center.
 It rapidly approaches zero as r goes to infinity, reflecting the short-distance nature of the strong nuclear force.

The Schrödinger equation of this potential can be solved analytically, by transforming it into a hypergeometric differential equation. The radial part of the wavefunction solution is given by

Here  is the hypergeometric function.

See also
Finite potential well
Quantum harmonic oscillator
Particle in a box
Yukawa potential
Nuclear force
Nuclear structure
Shell model

References

External links
http://nucracker.volya.net/ Woods–Saxon Solver

Nuclear physics

Quantum mechanical potentials
Exactly solvable models